1A1 may refer to:

 Leopard 1A1, a German battle tank
 Ishapore 1A1, an Indian rifle
 L1A1 Self-Loading Rifle, a British rifle

See also
 
 M1A1 (disambiguation)